Predix may refer to:
 Predix (software): General Electric's software platform for the Industrial Internet
 Epix Pharmaceuticals Inc (formerly Predix Pharmaceuticals Inc.)